Jitendarjit Singh Ahluwalia (born 9 May 1955) is an Indian equestrian. He competed in the 1980 Summer Olympics. in 2 events.

References

1955 births
Living people
Equestrians at the 1980 Summer Olympics
Indian male equestrians
Indian dressage riders
Olympic equestrians of India
Asian Games medalists in equestrian
Asian Games bronze medalists for India
Equestrians at the 1986 Asian Games
Equestrians at the 1994 Asian Games
Medalists at the 1986 Asian Games
Ahluwalia